Trev Kendall Alberts (born August 8, 1970) is an American sports administrator and former football linebacker who is the director of athletics at University of Nebraska–Lincoln. He played college football at Nebraska, where he won the Dick Butkus Award and Jack Lambert Trophy as a senior. Alberts was inducted to the College Football Hall of Fame in 2015.

Following his collegiate success, Alberts played in the National Football League (NFL) with the Indianapolis Colts, who selected him fifth overall in the 1994 NFL Draft. His career would only last three seasons, however, due to injuries. Alberts pursued a broadcasting career before serving as the athletic director at the University of Nebraska-Omaha from 2009 to 2021. In 2021, he returned to his alma mater at Nebraska's flagship campus in Lincoln to become its athletic director.

Early years
Alberts was born in Cedar Falls, Iowa to parents Ken Alberts, a business executive, and Linda. He also has an older brother, Troy, who went on to work as a sales director in an oil processor, and a sister, Tami, who teaches elementary school. Trev Alberts attended Northern University High School in Cedar Falls, where he played for the Northern University Panthers high school football team.

College career
While attending the University of Nebraska, he played for the Nebraska Cornhuskers football team from 1990 to 1993.  Following his senior season in 1993, he was awarded the Dick Butkus Award and Jack Lambert Trophy as the top college linebacker; Alberts was also recognized as a consensus first-team All-American, after recording 15 quarterback sacks, 21 tackles for loss, and 38 quarterback hurries.  Despite an injury early in the eleventh game of the season against the Oklahoma Sooners, Alberts returned with a cast on his arm for the national championship game against Florida State in the Orange Bowl. Although the Seminoles won 18-16, Alberts had a dominant performance with three sacks of Heisman Trophy-winner Charlie Ward (FSU quarterbacks were sacked only five times during the 1993 regular season).

Professional career
Due to injuries he played portions of just three seasons before retiring before the 1997 season, tallying just four career quarterback sacks and one interception.

Broadcasting career
Upon retirement from the NFL, Alberts was hired by the American cable television network CNN/SI and concomitantly its Sports Illustrated magazine, where he served as a college football contributor. In 2002, Alberts joined the staff of the American cable television network ESPN, where he worked as an in-studio analyst for college football, ultimately joining Rece Davis and Mark May on the network's College GameDay Scoreboard and College GameDay Final.

On September 6, 2005, Alberts was terminated by ESPN for breaching his contract when he declined to report to work; Alberts later claimed he did not want to "play second fiddle" to the more prominent cast of College GameDay, Chris Fowler, Kirk Herbstreit and Lee Corso.

Alberts thereafter accepted a position as a columnist for the website of the college sports cable television network CSTV. He worked as a color commentator for the NFL on Westwood One Sunday afternoon radio broadcasts in 2006.  He also provided color commentary for SEC football games on CBS.

Alberts also served as an analyst for Sprint Exclusive Entertainment, breaking down college football and other sports for viewers.

Athletic director

Alberts was hired in April 2009 to be the director of athletics for the Nebraska–Omaha Mavericks sports program at the University of Nebraska-Omaha.

Alberts made the controversial decision to eliminate football and wrestling in an effort to bring University of Nebraska-Omaha to Division I's Summit League. The regents approved the move March 25, 2011.

On July 14th, 2021, the University of Nebraska–Lincoln announced that he would be its next Athletic Director.

References

External links
 Nebraska profile
 
 

1970 births
Living people
American football linebackers
Indianapolis Colts players
Nebraska Cornhuskers football players
College football announcers
National Football League announcers
Nebraska Cornhuskers athletic directors
Omaha Mavericks athletic directors
All-American college football players
People from Cedar Falls, Iowa
Players of American football from Iowa